Heinz Laprell (born 16 August 1947) is a German sailor. He competed in the Tempest event at the 1972 Summer Olympics.

References

External links
 

1947 births
Living people
German male sailors (sport)
Olympic sailors of West Germany
Sailors at the 1972 Summer Olympics – Tempest
Sportspeople from Munich